Clive Harold Everton  (born 7 September 1937) is a sports commentator, journalist, author and former professional snooker and English billiards player. He founded Snooker Scene magazine, which was first published (as World Snooker) in 1971, and continued as editor until September 2022. He has authored over twenty books about cue sports since 1972.

He began commentating on snooker for BBC radio in 1972, and for BBC Television from 1978 until 2010. In the snooker boom years of the 1980s, he commentated alongside Ted Lowe and Jack Karnehm, and became the leading commentator in the 1990s. As an amateur player, he won junior titles in English billiards, and the Welsh billiards title several times. He was five-times runner up in the English amateur billiards championship, and twice a semi-finalist at the world amateur championship. In snooker, he partnered Roger Bales as they won the United Kingdom National Pairs Championship. Everton turned professional in 1981, achieving a highest ranking of 47th in the world in ten years as a snooker professional. He reached a peak of ninth place in the professional billiards rankings, and remained in the top 20 ranked players even into his sixties.

Everton played county-level tennis for Worcestershire for 13 years, and once managed Jonah Barrington, the former world number one squash player. In 2017, he was inducted into the Snooker Hall of Fame, and he was appointed Member of the Order of the British Empire (MBE) in the 2019 Birthday Honours for services to snooker.

Early life
Clive Harold Everton was born in Worcester on 7 September 1937. He was educated at King's School, Worcester, City of Birmingham College of Commerce, and later at Cardiff University, where he obtained a B.A. in English. After graduating, he taught English and Liberal Studies at Halesowen College of Further Education, before a career change into freelance journalism.

Cue sports career
Everton became interested in playing English billiards after his father took him to a match at Leicester Square Hall where Sidney Smith was playing. He started playing on a friend's quarter-size billiard table, before having his own bought for him, and then began to play on a full-size table several months later. He entered the British Boys (under-16) English billiards Championship for the first time in 1951, when he was 14, and lost in the first round to Brian Brooking by 147 points to 201. He won the 1953 under-16 billiards championship by defeating John Lambert by 401–197 in the final. The following year, he was runner-up in the under-19 Championship, losing 360–538 to Donald Scott. He reached the under-19 final again in 1956, and claimed the title with a 429–277 victory against Granville Hampson. He took the Welsh Amateur billiards championship title in 1960, 1972, 1973 and 1976, and was four-times runner up in the English Amateur billiards championship from 1967 to 1980.

During the 1977 world championship he experienced a back injury which eventually required discs in his spine to be fused, and Everton felt that his game never quite recovered. Despite this he would reach a high ranking in the professional billiards game of ninth, and remained in the top 20 ranked players even into his sixties. At the 2005 world billiards championship he was one of 17 participants, and lost all three of his qualifying group matches. He resigned his membership of the WPBSA in April 2006 during a dispute with the Association, which was seeking to take action against him through the Sports Dispute Resolution Panel as a result of criticism of it that he had published in Snooker Scene. Re-instated as an amateur, he won the Midlands amateur billiards title for the 14th time in 2008, having first taken the title in 1962.

In snooker, he reached the southern area final of the 1977 English Amateur Championship where he lost 1-8 to Terry Griffiths. A couple of months later, Everton and his playing partner Roger Bales won the 1977 National (UK) Pairs Championship after a 3–0 victory against Dickie Laws and John Pike in the final. He was accepted by the World Professional Billiards and Snooker Association (WPBSA) as a professional in 1981. In his professional debut, at the qualifying tournament for the 1981 International Open, he won his first match 5–4 against Kingsley Kennerley. In Everton's second match, Mike Watterson, who was also the tournament promoter, arrived 15 minutes late after not realising that the official start time was thirty minutes earlier than on publicity and tickets for the event, and therefore conceded a frame to Everton as per the tournament rules. Watterson won the match 5–4.

Everton's most notable win as a professional snooker player was a 5–2 defeat of Patsy Fagan in the last 64 of the 1982 Professional Players Tournament, representing the furthest that he ever reached in a major tournament. He lost to Cliff Thorburn by the same score in the last 32. He played in the Welsh Professional Championship on seven occasions, being seeded to the quarter-finals on four of these and the first round three times, but never won a match in the competition. His last match in professional snooker before retiring from competition was a 3–5 defeat by Mark Wildman at the 1991 British Open. He achieved a highest ranking of 47th in the world in ten years as a snooker professional.

Writing and television
After leaving Halesowen College, Everton worked as a freelance sports reporter, covering sports including hockey, tennis, badminton and squash for Birmingham Post, Birmingham Evening Mail, The Guardian, The Sunday Telegraph and other publications. He also commentated on snooker for BBC radio from 1972, and BBC television from the 1978 World Snooker Championship.

He was the editor of the magazine Billiards and Snooker, owned by the Billiards Association and Control Council, from the December 1966 issue until the February 1971 issue. According to Everton, he was sacked at the instigation of Jack Karnehm, the Chairman of the Billiards and Snooker Control Council (as the Billiards Association and Control Council had renamed itself) for "giving professionals publicity". In Everton's account, this followed him including picture of four professional players on the cover of Billiards and Snooker at a time when the Billiards and Snooker Control Council and the professional players were in dispute over the World Billiards Championship. This dispute led to the Professional Billiards Players Association renaming itself as the WPBSA and splitting from the Billiards and Snooker Control Council (B&SCC). Following his sacking, Everton established his own magazine, World Snooker. In 1972, the B&SCC approached Everton to take over Billiards and Snooker and paid him £1,000 to do so. Everton merged Billiards and Snooker and World Snooker into Snooker Scene, which published its first issue in April 1972. Snooker Scene has sometimes featured criticisms of the WPBSA which have led to legal disputes. As of August 2021, he remains as editor of Snooker Scene. Everton has said of Snooker Scene: "I had started this as a simple journal of record of what was happening on the table, but it became a crusading vehicle … Taking Wisden and Private Eye as our models we sometimes made our point through hard reporting, sometimes through satire."

Everton has authored over twenty books about cue sports. As a snooker commentator, during the hey-day of the game in the 1980s, he worked alongside Ted Lowe and Karnehm, and became the leading commentator in the 1990s. In September 2007 he published Black Farce and Cueball Wizards: The Inside Story of the Snooker World, which has a history of snooker as well as being autobiographical. The Independent on Sunday praised the book at "Revelatory stuff, masterfully written." Nick Harris of The Independent, noting that Everton was a correspondent for the publication's Sunday sister publication but saying that "nepotism is not required to recommend this book", wrote that it was a "terrific memoir-cum-history of the game." A review for his 2013 book A History of Billiards in The Independent on Sunday stated that "his affection for and encyclopaedic knowledge of the three-ball game shines through"

In 2009, it was announced that Everton would effectively lose his position as the BBC's primary snooker commentator; he did not commentate on the Masters, and only commentated on the World Championship until the quarter-final stages. This has variously been attributed to his criticism of the game's governing body, World Snooker, his age and old-fashioned style, and his lack of fame relative to the former players on the BBC's commentary roster. Everton commented, "I'm hurt and angry, because I find the reasons presented to me incomprehensible."

During the 2009–10 season, Everton's role at the BBC was reduced still further. He only commentated on two matches during the Grand Prix, and was not heard at all during the Masters. He commentated on days one to four of the 2010 World Snooker Championship and was heard again on day six, but that was his final commentary work of the tournament. According to Everton, the understanding for the 2010–11 season was that he would commentate if Steve Davis and Ken Doherty were not available due to them still participating in particular tournaments. He claims that he was offered four days' work at the 2011 World Snooker Championship, but that this was rescinded when Stephen Hendry was eliminated from the competition and became available for commentary. Everton was later told that his work for the following season would depend on Hendry's availability, and decided that this was the end of his relationship with the BBC. Since his departure from the BBC, Everton has continued commentating for ITV.

In the September 2022 issue of Snooker Scene, Everton announced that he would not be continuing as editor.

Personal life
Everton played county-level tennis for Worcestershire for 13 years, and has managed Jonah Barrington, the former world number one squash player. In 2017, he was inducted into the Snooker Hall of Fame at the annual Snooker Awards. He  was appointed Member of the Order of the British Empire (MBE) in the 2019 Birthday Honours for services to snooker.

Snooker performance and rankings timeline

Career finals

Publications
Everton has authored, or-co-authored, the following books:

Notes and references

External links
Profile on BBC Sport
BBC Berkshire: Clive Everton returns to the commentary box

1937 births
Living people
People educated at King's School, Worcester
British sports broadcasters
Snooker writers and broadcasters
English players of English billiards
Welsh snooker players
Sportspeople from Worcester, England
Members of the Order of the British Empire